Chak Fourteen MB is a village and one of the 51 Union Councils (administrative subdivisions) of Khushab District in the Punjab Province of Pakistan. It is located at 32°10'0N 72°52'20E.

References

Union councils of Khushab District
Populated places in Khushab District